Mark Allen Brunell (born September 17, 1970) is an American football coach and former quarterback who is the quarterbacks coach for the Detroit Lions of the National Football League (NFL). He played in the NFL for nineteen seasons and is best known for his nine seasons with the Jacksonville Jaguars, whom he led to the franchise's first playoff appearances between 1996 and 1999. For his accomplishments in Jacksonville, he was inducted to the Pride of the Jaguars in 2013.

Brunell played college football at Washington and was selected by the Green Bay Packers in the fifth round of the 1993 NFL Draft. After two seasons, Brunell was traded to the expansion Jaguars for their inaugural 1995 season. Within their second season, he helped the team obtain the franchise's first winning record, playoff berth, postseason victories, and appearance in the AFC Championship Game. Brunell went on to guide Jacksonville to four consecutive playoff runs within their first five seasons, the first NFL expansion team to do so, and clinched the franchise's first division title in 1999 en route to a second AFC Championship appearance. All three of his Pro Bowl selections were with the Jaguars.

Following his 2004 departure from Jacksonville, Brunell played for the Washington Redskins, New Orleans Saints, and New York Jets until retiring in 2011. With the Saints, he was part of the team that won the franchise's first Super Bowl in Super Bowl XLIV, where he served as a backup and holder. Since retiring, he has pursued a coaching career and became the Lions' quarterbacks coach in 2021.

Early years
Brunell was the starting quarterback for the St. Joseph High School Knights of Orcutt, California, in the 1985, 1986, and 1987 seasons. Brunell led his team to two league championships and one appearance in the CIF Central Section finals.

College career
Brunell signed with the University of Washington out of high school in 1988, a highly touted recruiting class that included future NFL players Lincoln Kennedy and Steve Emtman. Brunell saw his first action in his redshirt freshman year, and took over the starting duties in his sophomore season in 1990. Brunell's abilities as a run-pass combo quarterback flashed potential from his first start. In his third start, Brunell led the Huskies in a 31-0 romp over a highly ranked USC team, which established the Huskies of the early 1990s as a potential force in Pac-10 football. While Brunell continued to develop throughout his first season as a starter the Huskies climbed in the rankings. An early season loss to the eventual national champion Colorado and late season 25-22 loss to UCLA were the only setbacks for what, by season's end, was a dominant Husky team. With the Huskies crowned Pac-10 champions, Brunell played his best game yet in the Rose Bowl and was named the game's MVP as Washington coasted to a 46–34 win over Big Ten Conference Champion Iowa. After building a 39–14 lead after three quarters, Washington heavily substituted with reserves; the Hawkeyes scored twenty points in the fourth quarter.

Though the Huskies finished the season ranked 5th in the Associated Press poll, one poll crowned them national champions. Irrespective of their final ranking, the Huskies, with Brunell's star rising, seemed set to soar to even loftier heights in 1991. Brunell was expected to lead the Huskies in 1991, but a devastating knee injury in the annual Husky spring game would sideline Brunell and cast the Husky hopes for a national championship run in doubt. Brunell, however, was capably replaced by Puyallup native Billy Joe Hobert and the University of Washington went on to win their first two  games in Brunell's absence. Though Brunell was not yet fully recovered, he returned months ahead of schedule to action in Washington's third game in 1991. Brunell received a standing ovation upon his return in the 56-3 victory over Kansas State.

Brunell would be given opportunity to lead series on a part-time basis in the remainder of Husky games as the season progressed, typically at least one drive in each 2nd quarter in addition to the second half.  The 1991 Washington team defeated every regular season opponent with most games providing plenty of playing time for younger and back up players.

On January 1, 1992, Brunell played a small role (throwing a touchdown pass to Mario Bailey) in Washington's second straight Rose Bowl victory, this time over Michigan. Washington finished the season ranked first in the coaches poll, winning the National Championship, and 2nd in the Associated Press poll, behind undefeated Miami.

In 1992, with two successful quarterbacks returning (Hobert and Brunell), Brunell was unable to wrestle the starting QB spot away from Hobert and as such contributed in a limited role during their first eight games (all wins). However, during the week of November 2, 1992, the Los Angeles Times ran an exposé on Washington football wherein current starter Hobert was implicated in actions seemingly in violation of NCAA rules. As a result, Hobert was immediately suspended and Brunell was thrust back into the starting role for the Huskies. Now a senior, Brunell steered the devastated Huskies to one win in their last three regular season games. The Huskies, however, again won the Pac-10 and Brunell started his second Rose Bowl game, this time against Michigan.

In 2015, Brunell was inducted into the Rose Bowl Hall of Fame.

Statistics

Professional career

Green Bay Packers
The Green Bay Packers selected Brunell in the fifth round (118th overall) of the 1993 NFL Draft. Brunell was the fourth quarterback drafted in 1993 and was the second quarterback drafted from Washington after Billy Joe Hobert was selected in the third round (58th overall) by the Los Angeles Raiders. This became only the second time two quarterbacks were drafted from the same school in the same draft. It was speculated that Brunell's fall to the fifth round was due to fears that he might not be able to adapt to the pro game.

Brunell entered training camp as a backup quarterback and competed to be the primary backup against Ty Detmer. Brunell and Detmer ended up alternating as the primary backup quarterback, behind Brett Favre, throughout 1993 and 1994. As a rookie, Brunell did not appear in any games.

On October 20, 1994, Brunell made his professional regular season debut during a 13-10 overtime loss at the Minnesota Vikings in Week 8. Brunell entered the game during the second quarter after Brett Favre suffered a hip pointer. He immediately engineered a 49-yard drive that ended with his first career touchdown on a five-yard rush. Brunell finished the game completing 11 of 24 pass attempts for 79 passing yards and was held without a touchdown pass or interception.

Brunell became a restricted free agent after the 1994 NFL season and received a contract offer from the Philadelphia Eagles, who had just hired former Green Bay Packers’ defensive coordinator Ray Rhodes as their new head coach. Rhodes hired former Green Bay Packers’ wide receivers coach Jon Gruden to be the Philadelphia Eagles’ offensive coordinator and worked out a trade to acquire Brunell. Brunell was reluctant to accept the five-year contract offer from the Philadelphia Eagles as he did not want to spend his twenties as a backup quarterback behind Randall Cunningham. The Packers and Eagles agreed on the terms of a trade, but were unable to finalize the deal after Brunell declined to sign a long-term deal with the Philadelphia Eagles.

Jacksonville Jaguars
On April 21, 1995, the Jacksonville Jaguars traded third (66th overall) and fifth round (170th overall) picks in the 1995 NFL Draft to the Green Bay Packers in exchange for Brunell. This became the first trade in the Jacksonville Jaguars’ franchise history. The Jacksonville Jaguars signed Brunell to a three-year contract.

Brunell started 13 games in 1995, completed 201 out of 346 passes, for 2,168 yards, with 15 touchdowns and 7 interceptions. He also rushed for 480 yards.

During his years in Jacksonville, Brunell was selected to the Pro Bowl three times, in 1997, 1998, and 2000 and awarded the Pro Bowl MVP in the 1997 game. With Brunell starting, the Jaguars won an AFC Central Division title and became the first NFL expansion team to make the playoffs three times in its first four seasons of play. The furthest he led the team was to the 1996 AFC Championship Game, which they lost to the New England Patriots. They returned again in 1999, but would lose to the Tennessee Titans.

Brunell was benched in favor of Byron Leftwich following halftime of the third game of the 2003 season. It would be the final time Brunell took the field as a member of the Jaguars. As a starter since their inaugural season, Brunell left the team holding all of the Jacksonville Jaguars passing records.

In December 2013, Brunell was inducted into the Pride of the Jaguars, the team's Hall of Fame equivalent.

Washington Redskins
He was traded to the Washington Redskins prior to the 2004 season.

During the 2004 season, limited by a hamstring injury, Brunell struggled and would be benched midseason for backup quarterback Patrick Ramsey.  Ramsey's play towards the end of that season and following pre-season would lead to a quarterback controversy where Brunell would be benched going into the 2005 season. This would change in 2005 after Ramsey suffered an early season injury that thrust Brunell back into the starter's role.

In 2005, Brunell played much better and led the team to a 10–6 record and a playoff victory over the Tampa Bay Buccaneers. He finished third in the 2005 NFL Comeback Player of the Year awards.

Brunell's most prolific moment in the 2005 season was during Week 2, when he completed two long passes to wide receiver Santana Moss for two touchdowns in the final four minutes of the fourth quarter to defeat the Dallas Cowboys on Monday Night Football, 14–13.

On September 24, 2006, Brunell broke the NFL record for most consecutive completions in single game when he completed his first 22 passes against the Houston Texans. Brunell also set the Redskins franchise record for highest completion percentage in a single game (88.9%). The previous record was held by Hall of Fame quarterback Sammy Baugh for 66 years (87.5%).
On November 13, 2006, after winning only three of their first nine games of 2006, Brunell was benched in favor of Jason Campbell, Washington's 2005 first round draft pick.

New Orleans Saints
On March 13, 2008, Brunell was signed by the New Orleans Saints. As the Saints have not issued number 8 since Archie Manning retired, Brunell changed his jersey number to 11, the only time in his career he would wear a jersey number besides his customary number 8.

He entered the 2008 season as the backup to Drew Brees, appearing in just two games. In 2009, he appeared in all 16 games as the Holder on the Saints place-kicking unit, and saw his first playing time at quarterback in three years during a week 17 loss to the Carolina Panthers, as the Saints had already clinched homefield advantage and rested starter Drew Brees, as well as many other starters. Although he played little for the Saints, he was noted for his role as a veteran advisor to the Saints' starting quarterback, Drew Brees.

During the Saints playoff run on January 24, 2010, Brunell was the holder on the 40-yard field goal kicked by Garrett Hartley in overtime against the Minnesota Vikings in the NFC Championship Game to send the New Orleans Saints to the team's first ever Super Bowl. On February 7, 2010 for the Super Bowl, Brunell served as the Backup QB behind Drew Brees, and the Holder for Garrett Hartley. Brunell and Hartley’s role as the kicking unit helped the Saints get some big critical kicks, going 3 for 3 on three long field goals (46 yards, 44 yards, 47 yards), and an extra point, to score a total of 10 points in the first 3 quarters, helping keep the score close going into the 4th quarter, having the Saints down by only one point (16-17). The Colts would never score again, as the momentum shifted the Saints way. Brunell earned  his first and only Super Bowl ring with the New Orleans Saints when the team won its first franchise world championship by defeating the Indianapolis Colts 31-17 in Super Bowl XLIV.

New York Jets
Brunell was a free agent after the 2009 season, and did not re-sign with the Saints.  On July 28, 2010, he signed a two-year deal to play for the New York Jets. Brunell completed his first pass for the Jets on October 3 against the Buffalo Bills. In the last regular game of the 2010 season, while filling in for starting quarterback Mark Sanchez, Brunell threw his first scoring pass since 2006, a 17-yard touchdown pass to Santonio Holmes with 15 seconds left in the opening half. He then went on to throw a second scoring pass for 52 yards to Braylon Edwards in the second half. Brunell sat on the bench as the Jets made it to the AFC Championship but eventually lost to the Steelers 24-19.

After one season with the Jets, he was released on July 29, 2011. He was re-signed two days later at a reduced salary.

In April 2012, Brunell stated that he would like to play another season if the opportunity presented itself, contradicting a report from the Florida Times-Union that he was ready to retire.

Legacy
When Washington Redskins quarterback Jason Campbell, who played quarterback for the team after Brunell, was asked what player he learned the most from in his career, Campbell said it was Mark Brunell.  Campbell said "a nice tribute about how the man he replaced helped him become a better person off the field."

Football Nation ranked Brunell the twenty-ninth best quarterback of the post-merger era.

Coaching career

High school coaching
Brunell was an assistant football coach at Providence School in Jacksonville, Florida in 2012.  In January 2013, Brunell became the new head football coach and program director at Episcopal School of Jacksonville. Episcopal went 2–8 in Brunell's first season, then improved to 8–3 in 2014.

Detroit Lions
On January 28, 2021 Mark Brunell was hired by the Detroit Lions as quarterbacks coach.

NFL career statistics

Regular season

Playoffs

Franchise records
's NFL off-season, Brunell held at least 36 Jaguars franchise records, including:
 Completions: career (2,184), game (37 on 1996-10-20 @STL), playoffs (124), playoff season (56 in 1996)
 Pass Attempts: career (3,616), playoffs (244), playoff season (100 in 1996), playoff game (38 on 2000-01-23 TEN)
 Passing Yards: career (25,698), game (432 on 1996-09-22 @NWE), playoffs (1,525), playoff season (674 in 1996)
 Passing TDs: career (144), playoffs (10), playoff season (4 in 1998), playoff game (3 on 1999-01-10 @NYJ)
 Intercepted: career (86), season (20 in 1996), game (5 on 1996-10-20 @STL), playoffs (10), playoff season (4 in 1996), playoff game (3 on 1999-01-10 @NYJ)
 Passer Rating: playoff season (77.5 in 1999), playoff game (112 on 1997-01-04 @DEN)
 Sacked: career (333), season (57 in 2001), playoffs (15), playoff season (5 in 1999)
 Yds/Pass Att: career (7.11), season (7.84 in 1996), playoff game (8.45 on 1997-01-04 @DEN)
 Pass Yds/Game: playoffs (190.6), playoff season (224.7 in 1996)
 300+ yard passing games: career (22), season (6 in 1996)
 4000+ passing yards: career (1)

Personal life

Religious activities
Brunell, a devout Christian, and his family have been active members of the Metro Morningstar Church in Sterling, Virginia (now Grace Covenant Church). When they were living in Florida, Brunell was very active within Southpoint Community Church, a church on the southside of Jacksonville that he helped found. He was also one of the most involved members of Champions for Christ. He also conducted volunteer work at the University of North Florida.

Brunell's links with Champions for Christ has garnered some controversy, with the National Football League investigating CFC over concerns that players were being taken advantage of financially.

Family
Brunell is married to Stacy with a daughter, Caitlin, and three sons: Jacob, Joseph and Luke. Joseph is currently a quarterback for the Georgetown Hoyas.

Business ventures
Brunell has been credited in establishing numerous Whataburger fast food locations around the Jacksonville area. These businesses and the money they lost contributed to his bankruptcy proceedings.

Bankruptcy filing

On June 25, 2010, Brunell filed for Chapter 11 bankruptcy, at least in part due to numerous failed real estate and other business investments. It is also reported that Brunell and several of his co-investors (also former teammates) have defaulted on 'multiple' loans involving different properties around the country.

According to a Florida Times-Union report, Brunell listed approximately $5.5 million in assets against almost $25 million in liabilities. The liabilities are mostly in the form of personal guarantees on commercial real estate loans involving several of his limited liability corporations. The operation of 11 Whataburger franchise locations in which Brunell is involved will not be affected by the bankruptcy.

References

External links

 
 New York Jets profile
 New Orleans Saints profile

1970 births
Living people
American football quarterbacks
Green Bay Packers players
Jacksonville Jaguars players
New Orleans Saints players
New York Jets players
Washington Huskies football players
Washington Redskins players
High school football coaches in Florida
American Conference Pro Bowl players
Players of American football from Los Angeles
Sportspeople from Santa Maria, California
American Christians
Detroit Lions coaches
Ed Block Courage Award recipients